Telecom may refer to:
 Telecommunications
 A telephone company (or telecommunications service provider)
 The telecommunications industry
 Telecom Animation Film, a Japanese studio

See also 
 Telcom (disambiguation)
 Telekom (disambiguation)
 List of telephone operating companies
 BH Telecom, Bosnia and Herzegovina
 Bouygues Telecom, France
 BT Group, formerly British Telecom, United Kingdom
 China Telecom, China
 ER-Telecom, Russia
 Orange SA, formerly France Télécom
 Golan Telecom, Israel
 Hong Kong Telecom, China
 Nepal Telecom, Nepal
 Nortel, formerly Northern Telecom, Canada
 Rostelecom, Russia
 Telecom Argentina
 Telecom Éireann, Ireland
 Telecom Italia, Italy
Telecom Italia San Marino, San Marino
 Telstra, formerly Telecom Australia
 Tunisie Telecom, Tunisia
 Spark New Zealand, formerly Telecom New Zealand